This is a list of foreign players in the Danish Superliga, which commenced play in 1991.

The following players meet both of the following two criteria:
Have played at least one Superliga game. Players who were signed by Superliga clubs, but only played in lower league, cup and/or European games, or did not play in any competitive games at all, are not included.
Are considered foreign, i.e., outside Denmark. A player is considered foreign if he is not eligible to play for the national teams of Denmark.

Clubs listed are those that the player has played at least one Superliga game for. Seasons listed are those that the player has played at least one Superliga game in. Note that seasons, not calendar years, are used. For example, "1992–95" indicates that the player has played in every season from 1992–93 to 1994–95, but not necessarily every calendar year from 1992 to 1995. Included in parentheses are also the number of games and goals in each series of years.

In bold: players that have played at least one Superliga game in the current 2009–10 season, and the clubs they have played for. They include players that have subsequently left the club, but do not include current players of a Superliga club that have not played a Superliga game in the current season.

Last updated May 16, 2010

Africa (CAF)

Algeria
 Mehdi Guerrouad – Viborg FF – 2003–05 (4/0)
 Adda Djeziri – Vejle BK, HB Køge – 2008–09 (6/0), 2011–12 (4/0)

Angola
 Nando Rafael – AGF – 2008–10 (33/10)

Botswana
 Dipsy Selolwane – Vejle BK – 2001–02 (5/0)

Burkina Faso
 Oumar Barro – Brøndby IF – 1999–2002 (19/3)
 Ibrahim Gnanou – FC Midtjylland – 2007–08 (1/0)

Cameroon
 Christian Bassogog – AaB – 2015– (30/4)
 Eric Djemba-Djemba – Odense BK – 2008–2012 (102/3)
 Joseph Elanga – Brøndby IF, AC Horsens, Brøndby IF – 2005–07 (20/1), 2007–09 (32/1), 2008–09 (3/0)
 Patrice Kwedi – AGF – 2004–05 (8/0)
 Alphonse Tchami – Odense BK – 1992–95 (65/28)
 Bertrand Tchami – Odense BK – 1996–97 (2/0)
 Joel Tchami – AC Horsens – 2005–07 (8/1)
 Bernard Tchoutang – Viborg FF – 2003–04 (5/0)

Egypt
 Mohamed Zidan – AB, FC Midtjylland – 2000–03 (51/12), 2003–05 (47/30)

Eritrea
 Mohammed Saeid - Lyngby Boldklub - (5/0)

Gambia
 Aziz Corr – Fremad Amager, Hvidovre IF – 1994–95 (17/1), 1996–97 (2/0)
 Njogu Demba-Nyrén – Esbjerg fB, Odense BK – 2005–08 (61/21) 2011-13 (12/0) , 2008–11 (53/12)
 Ebrima Sowe – Herfølge BK – 2004–05 (22/3)
 Ousman Jallow – Brøndby IF – 2008–11 (70/14)
 Paul Jatta – Brøndby IF – 2009–10 (6/0)

Ghana
 David Addy – Randers FC – 2008–10 (20/0)
 Issah Ahmed – Randers FC – 2006–10 (71/4)
 Charles Akonnor – AC Horsens – 2005–07 (53/6)
 Daniel Amartey – FCK – 2014 (32/3)
 Godwin Attram – Silkeborg IF – 1999–2001 (31/5)
 Francis Dickoh – FC Nordsjælland, FC Midtjylland – 2003–06 (103/6), 2014 (23/0)
 Jones Kusi-Asare – Esbjerg fB – 2008–10 (9/0)
 Baba Musa – FC Midtjylland – 2001–02 (2/0)
 Prince Nana – AB – 2003–04 (1/0)
 Razak Pimpong – FC Midtjylland, FCK – 2000–06 (124/22), 2005–07 (21/0)
 Kwadwo Poku – FC Midtjylland – 2004–06 (22/2)
 Razak Salifu – AGF – 2007–09 (6/0)
 Ibrahim Salou – Vejle BK – 2008–09 (6/2)

Guinea
 Mohammed Diarra – Odense BK – 2012–16 (42/0)

Guinea-Bissau
 Eddi Gomes – Esbjerg fB – 2014–15 (13/1)

Ivory Coast
 Mamadou Coulibaly – FC Nordsjælland – 2004–05 (4/0)
 Evaristo Dibo – Vejle BK – 1995–96 (5/0)
 Raoul Kouakou – Viborg FF – 2006–07 (8/1)

Kenya
 Emmanuel Ake – AB, FC Nordsjælland, Herfølge BK, Lyngby Boldklub – 2000–04 (46/3), 2004–06 (14/0), 2009–10 (13/5), 2010-11 (1/0)

Liberia
 Dioh Williams – AGF – 2007–10 (62/12)

Malawi
 Joseph Kamwendo – FC Nordsjælland – 2005–07 (17/4)

Mali
 Kalilou Traoré - Odense Boldklub - (51/8)

Morocco
 Bouabid Bouden – Odense BK – 2005–06 (15/2)
 Karim Zaza – FCK, Odense BK, Brøndby IF, AaB – 1995–2000 (80/0), 2000–03 (79/0), 2003–06 (49/0), 2007–10 (81/0)

Niger
 Moussa Maâzou – Randers FC – 2016– (2/0)

Nigeria
 Akeem Agbetu – FC Midtjylland – 2005–07 (8/2)
 Oluwafemi Ajilore – FC Midtjylland – 2004–08 (76/4)
 Bosun Ayeni – Lyngby BK, BK Frem, FC Nordsjælland, AC Horsens – 1998–2002 (35/1), 2003–04 (18/1), 2004–07 (55/0), 2007–08 (3/0)
 Ibrahim Babatunde – AC Horsens – 2007–08 (6/0)
 Baba Collins – FC Midtjylland, Vejle BK – 2006–10 (59/11), 2008–09 (12/2)
 Friday Elahor – Brøndby IF – 1991–92 (12/0)
 Justice John Erhenede – Vejle BK – 2006–07 (12/0)
 Emeka Ezeugo – Lyngby BK, BK Frem, AaB, Fremad Amager – 1991–93 (31/2), 1992–93 (3/0), 1992–94 (14/3), 1994–95 (4/0)
 Ahmed Garba – AB – 2003–04 (12/4)
 Rilwan Hassan – FC Midtjylland, Sønderjyske – 2010-2019 (223/23), 2019-2022 (74/4)
 Sylvester Igboun – FC Midtjylland – 2009–15 (147/41)
 Peter Ijeh – FCK – 2005–06 (16/4)
 Mojo Kingsley – Viborg FF – 2004–05 (2/0)
 Adeshina Lawal – Vejle BK – 2006–07 (11/2), 2008–09 (12/1)
 Ayinde Lawal – FC Midtjylland – 2006–08 (3/0)
 Christian Muomaife – Viborg FF – 2006–08 (36/8)
 Jude Ikechukwu Nworuh – FC Midtjylland, AC Horsens – 2007–13 (75/12), 2012-13 (21/2)
 Paul Obiefule – Viborg FF – 2004–07 (40/0)
 Kim Ojo - Lyngby Boldklub - 2016-2018 (29/4)
 Uche Okechukwu – Brøndby IF – 1991–94 (61/9)
 Chima Okorie – Ikast fS, Viborg FF – 1995–96 (9/1), 1996–97 (3/0)
 Sekou Oliseh – FC Midtjylland – 2008–10 (5/0)
 Chidi Dauda Omeje – Vejle BK – 2008–09 (8/1)
 Paul Onuachu – FC Midtjylland – 2013 (22/1)
 Adeola Runsewe – FC Midtjylland – 2007–08 (5/0)
 Adigun Salami – FC Midtjylland, Sønderjyske – 2006–12 (106/2), 2012-13 (2/0)
 Abdul Sule – AB, AC Horsens – 1998–2004 (137/30), 2005–06 (23/0)
 Emanuel Ukpai – Esbjerg fB – 2007–10 (36/2)
 Peter Utaka – Odense BK – 2008–12 (108/52)
 Izunna Uzochukwu – FC Midtjylland, Odense BK – 2008–15 (149/4), 2015-18 (53/1)

Senegal
 Baye Djiby Fall – Randers FC, Odense BK – 2006–07 (30/14), 2007–09 (31/18)
 Dame N'Doye – FCK – 2008–12 (104/59), 2018-20 (47/30)
 Tidiane Sane – Randers FC – 2006–12 (171/27)

South Africa
 Bradley August – Lyngby BK – 1999–2002 (61/15)
 Josta Dladla – AGF – 2001–04 (62/9)
 Mandla Masango – Randers FC – 2015 (0/0)
 Siyabonga Nomvethe – AaB – 2006–09 (72/10)
 Lebogang Phiri – Brøndby IF – 2013 (60/4)
 Giovanni Rector – Brøndby IF – 2006–07 (5/0)
 Frank Schoeman – Lyngby BK – 1999–2002 (27/0)
 Elrio van Heerden – FCK – 2003–06 (26/4)
 Benedict Vilakazi – AaB – 2007–08 (5/0)
 Sibusiso Zuma – FCK, FC Nordsjælland – 1999–2005 (145/41), 2009–10 (13/1)

Togo
 Komla Loglo Thomsen – Lyngby BK – 1996–97 (4/0)

Uganda
 Robert Kakeeto – AaB – 2015– (1/0)

Zambia
 Chris Katongo – Brøndby IF – 2006–09 (44/10)
 Mwape Miti – Odense BK – 1997–98 (19/2), 1999–2006 (159/68)
 Andrew Tembo – Lyngby BK – 1997–98 (26/2), 1999–2006 (192/10)

Zimbabwe
 Quincy Antipas – HB Køge, SønderjyskE, Brøndby IF, Hobro IK – 2009–10 (13/3), 2010–12 (63/16), 2012–14 (46/6), 2014 (23/5)

Asia (AFC)

Australia
 Mustafa Amini – Randers FC, AGF – 2015–16 (29/0), 2016–20 (119/10)
 Michael Beauchamp – AaB – 2008–09 (12/1)
 Shane Cansdell-Sheriff – AGF – 2003–06 (82/7)
 Nathan Coe – FCK, Randers FC, SønderjyskE – 2007–09 (3/0), 2009–10 (4/0), 2010–12 (64/0)
 Jack Duncan – Randers FC – 2015–16 (1/0)
 Zach Duncan – AGF – 2019– (24/0)
 Alex Gersbach – AGF – 2019–21 (8/0)
 Chris Ikonomidis – AGF – 2016–17 (18/1)
 Joel King – Odense Boldklub – 2022– (2/0)
 Awer Mabil – FC Midtjylland, Esbjerg fB – 2015–16 (6/0), 2016 (6/0)
 Brent McGrath – Brøndby IF, Esbjerg fB – 2008–13 (40/2), 2016–19 (26/1)
 Jamie McMaster – AGF – 2005–06 (6/0)
 Sasho Petrovski – Viborg FF – 2001–04 (53/16)
 Lawrence Thomas – SønderjyskE – 2020– (53/0)
 David Williams – Brøndby IF – 2006–09 (34/4)

Iran
 Navid Dayyani – AGF – 2003–06 (17/0)
 Daniel Norouzi – Brøndby IF – 2012 (18/0)
 Daniel Stückler – Brøndby IF, FC Helsingør – 2014–16 (9/1), 2017–18 (6/0)

Iraq
 Ahmed Yasin Ghani – AGF – 2015 (17/1)

Japan
 Suguru Hashimoto – Vejle BK – 2009–10 (2/0)
 Yoshikatsu Kawaguchi – FC Nordsjælland – 2003–04 (8/0)

Korea
 Park Jung-bin – Hobro IK, Viborg FF – 2015–16 (22/2), 2016- (28/2)
 Yun Suk-young – Brøndby IF – 2016–17 (1/0)

Pakistan
 Adnan Mohammad - FC Nordsjælland, FC Helsingør, Lyngby Boldklub - 2015-17 (11/0), 2017-18 (31/3), 2019-20 (8/1)

Philippines
 Dennis Cagara – FC Nordsjælland, AGF, Lyngby – 2007-10 (55/2), 2009-10 (14/0), 2011-12 (15/0)
 Jerry Lucena – AGF, Esbjerg fb – 2007-12 (147/3), 2012-16 (34/0)
 Daisuke Sato – Horsens – 2017-18 (3/0)
 Michael Falkesgaard - Brøndby IF, Odense BK - 2009-2015 (8/0), 2015-2017 (9/0)

Syria
 Louay Chanko – AaB – 2009-12 (59/3)

Europe (UEFA)

Albania
 Besart Berisha – AaB, AC Horsens, – 2004–05 (2/0), 2005–06 (32/11), 2008–09 (13/4)
 Blerim Rrustemi – AC Horsens – 2007–08 (1/0)

Armenia
 Robert Arzumanyan – Randers FC – 2007–10 (34/0)
 Yura Movsisyan – Randers FC – 2009–10 (13/7)

Austria
 Hannes Eder – SønderjyskE – 2011 (2/0)
 Marco Meilinger – AaB – 2015– (20/3)
 Martin Pušić – Esbjerg fB, FC Midtjylland –2014–15 (29/14), 2015 (17/8)

Belarus
 Eduard Demenkovets – Vejle BK – 1995–97 (21/3)
 Andrei Shilo – FC Nordsjælland – 2002–03 (4/0)

Belgium
 Hans Christiaens – Brøndby IF – 1991–93 (23/2)
 Thomas Kaminski – FCK – 2015–16 (2/0)

Bosnia and Herzegovina
 Demir Čerkić – B 1909 – 1992–93 (10/0)
 Sanel Kapidžić – AGF – 2008–10 (12/1)
 Arman Mehaković – HB Køge – 2009–10 (15/0)
 Bojan Tadić – Herfølge BK – 2004–05 (5/0)

Bulgaria
 Dormushali Saidhodzha – Randers FC – 2006–07 (2/0)
 Todor Yanchev – Randers FC – 2006–07 (30/3)

Croatia
 Ivica Antolić – Hvidovre IF – 1996–97 (8/0)
 Dražen Besek – Ikast fS – 1993–94 (17/1)
 Josip Elez – AGF – 2015 (4/1)
 Kristian Ipsa – FC Midtjylland – 2008–13 (88/2)
 Filip Marčić – FC Midtjylland – 2008–10 (7/0)
 Samir Mekić – Ikast fS – 1994–95 (2/0)
 Dario Mijatović – Vejle BK – 2006–07 (26/0)
 Dino Mikanović – AGF – 2015 (34/0)
 Mirko Selak – BK Frem – 2003–04 (19/6)
 Mate Šestan – FCK – 1996–98 (30/4)

Czech Republic
 Jan Kliment – Brøndby IF – 2016– (12/1)
 Zdenek Pospech – FCK – 2007–11 (108/13)
 Martin Raška – FC Midtjylland – 2006–10 (41/0)
 Libor Sionko – FCK – 2007–10 (54/9)

England
 Mark Briggs – Herfølge BK – 2003–04 (1/0)
 Ben Bowditch – AB – 2003–04 (9/0)
 Graham Easter – Viborg FF – 1993–96 (15/0)
 Adam Eckersley – Brøndby IF, AC Horsens – 2006–07 (4/0), 2008–09 (17/1)
 Joshua Gowling – Herfølge BK – 2003–05 (30/0)
 Mark Howard – Brøndby IF, AGF – 2006–09 (45/1), 2009–10 (18/1)
 Chris Kiwomya – AaB – 2001–02 (4/0)
 Stephen Lowe – Viborg FF – 1993–97 (38/0)
 Chris Orton – SønderjyskE – 2000–01 (23/1)
 David Preece – Silkeborg IF – 2005–07 (56/0)
 Mark Robins – FCK – 1996–97 (6/4)
 Scott Sellars – AGF – 2000–02 (20/1)
 Jamie Slabber – AB – 2003–04 (4/0)
 Christian Taylor – B.93 – 1998–99 (2/0)
 Matthew Turner – Herfølge BK – 2003–04 (10/0)

Estonia
 Risto Kallaste – Viborg FF – 1995–96 (23/4)
 Andres Oper – AaB – 1999–2003 (117/28)
 Urmas Rooba – FC Midtjylland, FCK, Vejle BK – 2000–02 (63/0), 2002–06 (33/0), 2006–07 (1/0)
 Kaimar Saag – Silkeborg IF – 2009–10 (19/2)
 Andrei Sidorenkov – SønderjyskE – 2008–10 (24/1)
 Indrek Zelinski – AaB, BK Frem – 2001–03 (35/13), 2003–04 (9/0)

Faroe Islands
 Jákup á Borg – Odense BK – 2003–04 (1/0)
 Tem Hansen – Lyngby BK – 2007–08 (12/2)
 Christian Holst – Lyngby BK, Silkeborg IF – 2007–08 (31/9), 2009–10 (33/11)
 Christian Høgni Jacobsen – Vejle BK, Esbjerg fB – 2001–02 (10/0), 2001–02 (3/0)
 Jón Rói Jacobsen – Brøndby IF, AaB – 2002–03 (4/0), 2005–08 (14/1)
 Rógvi Jacobsen – SønderjyskE – 2005–06 (4/0)
 Óli Johannesen – AGF – 1999–2001 (16/0)
 Todi Jónsson – Lyngby BK, FCK – 1993–97 (76/18), 1997–2005 (167/54)
 Jakup Mikkelsen – Herfølge BK – 1995–2001 (136/2)
 Súni Olsen – AaB, Viborg FF – 2005–08 (26/1), 2007–08 (7/1)
 Gilli Sørensen – AaB – 2014 (14/0)
 Brandur Hendriksson  FCK – 2013 (7/2)

Finland
 Tuomas Aho – AGF – 2004–06 (18/0)
 Tommi Grönlund – Viborg FF – 1996–97 (12/1)
 Jukka Hakala – Silkeborg IF – 1998–99 (1/0), 2001–02 (7/0)
 Petri Helin – Ikast fS, Viborg FF – 1993–96 (48/3), 1996–97 (5/0)
 Lukáš Hrádecký – Esbjerg fB – 2009–10 (5/0)
 Aki Hyryläinen – FCK – 1996–98 (14/0)
 Antti Niemi – FCK – 1995–97 (47/0)
 Jussi Nuorela – Silkeborg IF – 2001–02 (5/0)
 Antti Okkonen – Silkeborg IF – 2006–07 (12/0)
 Daniel O'Shaughnessy – FC Midtjylland – 2016 (1/0)
 Saku Puhakainen – Aarhus Fremad – 1997–98 (3/1)
 Teemu Pukki – Brøndby IF – 2014–15 (27/9), 2015 (5/4)
 Jukka Raitala – FC Vestsjælland, AaB – 2015 (15/0), 2015 (3/0)
 Kari Rissanen – Ikast fS – 1997–98 (13/0)
 Janne Saarinen – F.C. Copenhagen – 2004–06 (16/0)
 Jukka Santala – FC Nordsjælland – 2005–07 (30/11)
 Tim Sparv – FC Midtjylland – 2014 (29/0)
 Antti Sumiala – Ikast fS – 1994–95 (14/4)
 Janne Suokonautio – Hvidovre IF – 1996–97 (4/0)

France
 Alain Behi – Randers FC – 2007–09 (12/0)
 Bédi Buval – Randers FC – 2007–09 (57/15)
 Stefan Campagnolo – BK Frem – 2003–04 (2/0)
 Garra Dembélé – AGF – 2007–08 (3/0)
 Michaël Murcy – Esbjerg fB – 2004–08 (96/19)
 William Prunier – FCK – 1995–96 (11/0)
 Arthur Sorin – AGF – 2008–09 (8/0)
 Bernard Mendy – OB – 2011–12 (40/2)

Georgia
 Mikheil Ashvetia – FCK – 2001–02 (5/0)
 David Devdariani – AGF – 2008–10 (38/3)
 Vladimir Dvalishvili – Odense BK – 2014 (12/2)
 Gocha Kokoshvili – Næstved BK – 1995–96 (13/0)
 George Popkhadze – Viborg FF – 2006–08 (25/0)
 Davit Skhirtladze – AGF – 2011 (63/4)
 Mate Vatsadze – AGF – 2012 (60/27)

Germany
 Kolja Afriyie – Esbjerg fB, FC Midtjylland – 2004–06 (54/4), 2006–10 (100/4)
 Steffen Lauser – AC Horsens – 2007–09 (18/1)
 Denni Patschinsky – Viborg FF – 2001–02 (2/0), 2003–04 (6/0)
 Kent Scholz – Vejle BK – 1996–2000 (100/0)
 Mustafa Kučuković – SønderjyskE – 2010–2011 (15/4)
 Marvin Pourie – Silkeborg IF – 2011– (2/0)
 Stefan Wessels – OB – 2011-12 (35/0)
 Davidson Drobo-Ampem - Esbjerg fB - 2011- (2/0)

Hungary
 Zoltán Balog – Viborg FF – 2007–08 (15/0)
 Balazs Kiskapusi – AB – 2003–04 (11/0)
 Balázs Rabóczki – FCK – 2002–05 (41/0)
 Akos Takacs – Vejle BK – 2006–07 (15/0)
 Zoltán Szatmári - Lyngby Boldklub - 2011-12 (1/0)

Iceland
 Kári Árnason – AGF, Esbjerg fB – 2007–09 (37/1), 2008–09 (8/0)
 Theódór Elmar Bjarnason – AGF – 2015 (0/0)
 Bjarni Ólafur Eiríksson – Silkeborg IF – 2005–07 (41/0)
 Alfred Finnbogason - Lyngby Boldklub - 2022- (5/0)
 Rúrik Gíslason – Viborg FF, Odense BK, FCK – 2007–08 (26/2), 2009–13 (87/10), 2012-15 (68/5)
 Stefan Gislason – Brøndby IF – 2007–10 (70/6)
 Thorhallur Dan Johansson – Vejle BK – 1997–98 (6/0)
 Hallgrímur Jónasson - Sønderjyske, Odense BK, Lyngby Boldklub - 2011-15 (96/5), 2014-16 (48/0), 2016-18 (21/1)
 Ólafur Kristjánsson – AGF – 1997–2001 (65/1)
 Sævar Atli Magnússon - Lyngby Boldklub - 2022- (14/2)
 Gudmundur Mete – FC Midtjylland – 2001–02 (1/0)
 Sölvi Ottesen – SønderjyskE, FCK – 2008–10 (54/6), 2010-13 (43/8)
 Holmar Örn Runarsson – Silkeborg IF – 2006–07 (25/4)
 Frederik Schram - Lyngby Boldklub - 2019-21 (3/0)
 Hannes Sigurdsson – Brøndby IF – 2006–07 (9/2)
 Helgi Sigurdsson – AGF – 2003–06 (41/8)
 Ólafur Ingi Skúlason – SønderjyskE – 2009–10 (13/2)
 Hördur Sveinsson – Silkeborg IF – 2005–07 (34/9)
 Björn Daníel Sverrisson – AGF – 2016– (14/2)
 Gunnar Heidar Thorvaldsson – Esbjerg fB – 2008–10 (24/2)
 Tómas Ingi Tómasson – AGF – 1998–2000 (37/4)
 Adalstein Viglundsson – B 1909 – 1992–93 (6/0)

Israel
 Daniel Niron – Hvidovre IF – 1996–97 (15/5)

Latvia
 Imants Bleidelis – Viborg FF – 2002–05 (55/6)
 Igors Stepanovs – Esbjerg fB – 2006–08 (17/0)

Lithuania
 Briaunys Algimantas – FCK – 1995–96 (1/0)
 Rytis Leliuga – HB Køge – 2009–10 (13/0)
 Aurelijus Skarbalius – Brøndby IF, Herfølge BK – 1996–2006 (142/1), 2004–05 (8/0)
 Lukas Spalvis – AaB – 2013 (27/10)
 Arunas Suika – Lyngby BK, Silkeborg IF – 1995–96 (20/4), 1995–97 (15/4)
 Donatas Vencevicius – FCK – 1999–2002 (46/2)
 Tomas Žvirgždauskas – Næstved BK – 1995–96 (4/0)

Kosovo
 Herolind Shala - Lyngby Boldklub - 2017-18 (8/1)

Macedonia
 Nikola Gjoševski – FC Midtjylland – 2005–06 (1/0)
 Dejvi Glavevski – Vejle BK – 1995–98 (47/11)
 Ferhan Hasani – Brøndby IF – 2013–15 (35/7)
 Erdinc Iljazovski – Lyngby BK – 1994–96 (2/1)
 Gorazd Mihailov – Hvidovre IF – 1996–97 (4/0)
 Dzevdet Sainoski – FC Nordsjælland – 2002–03 (12/1)
 Artim Sakiri – AaB – 2005–06 (12/3)
 Bajram Fetai - Silkeborg IF, FC Nordsjælland, Lyngby Boldklub - 2005-07 (18/2), 2006-11 (110/22), 2010-12 (42/6)

Moldova
 Simeon Bulgaru – Viborg FF – 2007–08 (7/0)
 Serguei Dadu – FC Midtjylland – 2006–08 (23/5)

Montenegro
 Slobodan Marović – Silkeborg IF – 1994–95 (15/0)
 Srđan Radonjić – Odense BK, Viborg FF – 2006–08 (18/4), 2007–08 (5/1)
 Samel Šabanović – Esbjerg fB – 2008–09 (14/4)
 Milenko Vukčević – Viborg FF – 1996–97 (14/1)

Netherlands
 Mick van Buren – Esbjerg fB – 2013–16 (68/18)
 Fernando Derveld – Odense BK, Esbjerg fB – 2001–05 (122/6), 2006–08 (34/0)
 Fabian Ho-a-Hing – Lyngby BK – 1996–97 (4/0)
 Tim Janssen – Esbjerg fB – 2009–10 (32/15)
 Joshua John – FC Nordsjælland – 2012–13 (22/10), 2013 (49/13)
 Mohamed El Makrini – Odense BK – 2015 (0/0)
 Steve Olfers – AaB – 2007–09 (42/1)
 Remco van der Schaaf – Brøndby IF, Randers FC – 2008–11 (44/6), 2012-13 (9/0)
 Jeroen Veldmate – Vibrog FF – 2015 (6/1)
 Clemens Zwijnenberg – AaB – 1997–98 (9/0)
 Jos Hooiveld - FCK - 2010-21 (11/1)

Northern Ireland
 Roy Carroll – Odense BK – 2009–11 (46/0)

Norway
 Alexander Aas – Odense BK – 2004–07 (49/2)
 Trond Andersen – AaB, Brøndby IF – 2003–06 (65/2), 2005–06 (18/1)
 Vetle Andersen – Lyngby BK – 1993–95 (27/1)
 Petter Belsvik – AaB – 1994–95 (3/1)
 André Bergdølmo – FCK – 2005–2007 (33/3)
 Trond Bjørndal – Vejle BK – 1999–2000 (8/0)
 Stig Inge Bjørnebye – Brøndby IF – 1999–2000 (13/2)
 Lars Bohinen – Lyngby BK – 2000–02 (26/0)
 Bård Borgersen – AaB – 2001–05 (46/1)
 Harald Brattbakk – FCK – 1999–2001 (31/14)
 Christian Clem – Lyngby BK, Fremad Amager, Brøndby IF – 1991–93 (14/1), 1994–95 (15/5), 1994–95 (3/1)
 Tore André Dahlum – AaB – 2000–01 (10/2)
 Dan Eggen – Brøndby IF – 1991–98 (167/19)
 Mohammed Fellah – Esbjerg fB, FC Nordsjælland– 2013–16 (54/3), 2016– (0/0)
 Morten Fevang – Odense BK – 2005–07 (28/5)
 Håvard Flo – AGF – 1994–97 (53/27)
 Petter Furuseth – Viborg FF, FC Midtjylland – 2007–08 (17/2), 2007–09 (16/2)
 Christer George – AGF – 2004–06 (40/10)
 Thomas Gill – AaB Fodbold, FCK – 1993–96 (81/0), 1998–99 (5/0)
 Stig Haaland – Aarhus Fremad – 1998–99 (24/3)
 Rune Hagen – Herfølge BK – 2004–05 (13/0)
 Jan Halvor Halvorsen – AGF – 1991–94 (67/1)
 Brede Hangeland – FCK – 2005–08 (63/3)
 Alexander Lund Hansen – Odense BK – 2009–12 (6/0)
 Jonny Hanssen – AGF – 2004–06 (36/4)
 Tom Reidar Haraldsen – Viborg FF – 2006–07 (3/0)
 Roger Helland – Brøndby IF – 1999–2000 (12/0)
 Daniel Fredheim Holm – AaB – 2009–10 (13/3)
 Magne Hoseth – FCK – 2004–05 (28/8)
 Tom Høgli – FCK – 2014 (34/1)
 Atle Roar Håland – Odense BK, AGF – 2007–11 (90/3), 2011-13 (34/0)
 Kristoffer Larsen - Lyngby Boldklub - 2016-18 (34/4)
 Magnus Lekven – Esbjerg fB – 2012 (77/2)
 Thomas Myhre – FCK – 2000–01 (14/0)
 Erik Mykland – FCK – 2001–04 (51/1)
 Kristian Flittie Onstad – Esbjerg fB – 2006–09 (68/0)
 Jan Tore Ophaug – Odense BK – 2004–08 (73/1)
 Morten Pedersen – Brøndby IF – 1991–92 (1/0)
 Elbasan Rashani – Brøndby IF – 2014 (18/2)
 Roger Risholt – AGF – 2005–06 (20/1)
 Einar Rossbach – Silkeborg IF – 1994–95 (11/0)
 Kjetil Pedersen – Esbjerg fB – 2002–04 (62/2)
 Espen Ruud – Odense BK – 2008–15 (197/19)
 Ståle Solbakken – AaB, FCK – 1997–2001 (79/13), 2000–01 (14/4)
 Kenneth Storvik – Lyngby BK, BK Frem – 1995–96 (4/0), 2003–04 (7/1)
 Frank Strandli – AaB – 1998–2001 (38/14)
 Magne Sturød – Odense BK, AC Horsens – 2005–07 (12/0), 2006–08 (13/0)
 Bengt Sæternes – Odense BK – 2007–08 (9/1)
 Alex Valencia – AGF – 2007–09 (24/2)
 Fredrik Winsnes – AaB – 2005–07 (45/4)
 Kjetil Wæhler – AaB – 2008–10 (36/1)
 Thomas Wæhler – Lyngby BK – 1996–97 (7/0)
 Anders Østli – SønderjyskE – 2008–10 (48/1)

Poland
 Robert Bernat – Vejle BK – 1997–98 (1/0)
 Marek Czakon – BK Frem, Næstved BK – 1991–93 (24/3), 1993–94 (7/2)
 Arkadiusz Gmur – AGF – 1994–96 (37/1)
 Czesław Jakołcewicz – Odense BK – 1991–92 (7/0)
 Jacek Kacprzak – AGF – 1999–2000 (6/1)
 Maciej Łykowski – AGF – 2001–02 (1/0)
 Tomasz Mazurkiewicz – AGF, SønderjyskE – 2001–05 (58/5), 2005–06 (4/1)
 Rafał Niżnik – Brøndby IF – 2001–03 (32/3)
 Arek Onyszko – Viborg FF, Odense BK, FC Midtjylland – 1998–2004 (173/0), 2003–09 (177/0), 2009–10 (13/0)
 Piotr Parzyszek – Randers FC – 2015 (0/0)
 Andrzej Rudy – Brøndby IF – 1991–92 (8/1)
 Marek Saganowski – AaB – 2008–09 (13/3)
 Piotr Stokowiec – AB – 2001–02 (10/1)
 Artur Toborek – Ikast fS – 1994–95 (18/1)
 Grzegorz Więzik – Silkeborg IF, Viborg FF – 1991–93 (19/3), 1993–94 (18/3)
 Kamil Wilczek – Brøndby IF – 2016– (33/15)

Portugal
 Hélder Cabral – Vejle BK – 2008–09 (4/0)
 Tiago Targino – Randers FC – 2008–09 (17/1)

Republic of Ireland
 Michael Doyle – AGF – 2001–02 (22/4)
 Liam Miller – AGF – 2001–02 (18/0)

Romania
 George Florescu – FC Midtjylland – 2007–10 (54/3)
 Jean-Claude Bozga – FC Vestsjælland – 2013– (40/2)
 Adrian Petre – Esbjerg fB – 2018–20 (51/11)

Russia
 Oleg Ivanov – Ikast fS – 1995–96 (6/0)
 Dzhamaldin Khodzhaniyazov – AGF – 2015– (29/1)
 Erik Korchagin – AB – 2000–01 (17/2)
 Valeri Popovitch – Ikast fS – 1995–96 (6/3)

Serbia
 Aleksandar Čavrić – AGF – 2015–16 (19/1)
 Aleksandar Jovanović – AGF – 2016– (19/0)
 Nenad Novaković – FC Nordsjælland – 2008–10 (27/0)
 Milan Simeunović – Viborg FF – 1999–2000 (1/0)

Slovakia
 Martin Dúbravka – Esbjerg fB – 2014 (52/0)
 Maroš Klimpl – FC Midtjylland – 2007–08 (14/1)
 Milan Timko – AaB – 2003–04 (1/0)
 Robert Veselovsky – Viborg FF – 2007–08 (8/0)

Slovenia
 Benjamin Verbič – FCK – 2015 (3/0)
 Mitja Mörec - Lyngby Boldklub - 2011 (5/0)

Scotland
 Chris Iwelumo – Aarhus Fremad – 1998–99 (27/4)
 Steven Pressley – Randers FC – 2008–09 (9/0)

Spain
 Thomas Christiansen – Herfølge BK – 2000–01 (4/2)
 Daniel de Pedro Vide – Fremad Amager – 1994–95 (2/0)
 Piscu – AGF – 2015–2016 (5/0)

Sweden
 Marcus Allbäck – Lyngby BK, FCK – 1997–98 (4/1), 2005–08 (85/34)
 John Alvbåge – Viborg FF – 2005–08 (87/0)
 Anders Andersson – AaB – 1998–2001 (70/8)
 Gregor Andrijevski – Odense BK – 1999–2000 (16/1)
 Tomas Antonelius – FCK – 2001–03 (27/0)
 Mikael Antonsson – FCK – 2007–11 (86/2), 2014-18 (45/0)
 Kristoffer Arvhage – AaB – 2004–05 (11/1)
 Jeffrey Aubynn – AGF – 2003–05 (29/4)
 Andreas Augustsson – AC Horsens – 2008–09 (14/1)
 Patrick Bengtsson – Herfølge BK – 2000–01 (6/0)
 Pierre Bengtsson – FC Nordsjælland, FCK, Vejle BK, – 2009–11 (39/1), 2011-14 (109/2) 2017-22 (63/2), 2020-21 (4/0)
 Fredrik Berglund – Esbjerg fB, FCK – 2003–06 (75/43), 2006–07 (29/7)
 Filip Bergman – AGF – 1999–2000 (4/0)
 Billy Berntsson – Herfølge BK – 2003–05 (18/0)
 Jonas Bjurström – Esbjerg fB – 2006–08 (10/0)
 Fredrik Björck – Esbjerg fB – 2007–10 (56/3)
 Nicklas Carlsson – AGF – 2003–05 (41/0)
 Andreas Dahl – FC Nordsjælland – 2007–09 (38/1)
 Henrik Dahl – Silkeborg IF – 2002–03 (14/2)
 Bobbie Friberg da Cruz – Randers FC – 2008–10 (24/0)
 Bojan Djordjic – AGF – 2002–03 (25/0)
 Hans Eklund – Viborg FF – 1998–2001 (51/21)
 Johan Elmander – Brøndby IF – 2004–06 (58/22), 2014–16 (45/6)
 Martin Ericsson – AaB, Brøndby IF – 2003–06 (63/16), 2005–09 (83/19)
 Magnus Eriksson – Brøndby IF – 2015–2016 (22/1)
 Ken Fagerberg – FC Midtjylland, AC Horsens, Viborg FF  – 2007–11 (41/6), 2011-13 (30/5), 2013-14 (2/0)
 Per Fahlström – Lyngby BK – 1998–2002 (86/0)
 Alexander Farnerud – Brøndby IF – 2008–11 (73/18)
 Martin Fribrock – Esbjerg fB – 2008–09 (4/0)
 Tobias Grahn – Lyngby BK, AGF, Odense BK, Randers FC – 1999–2002(36/2), 2004–06 (47/10), 2006–07 (15/6), 2008–10 (19/0)
 Richard Henriksson – AGF – 2005–06 (3/0)
 Daniel Hoch – AaB – 2005–06 (4/1)
 Samuel Holmén – Brøndby IF – 2007–10 (83/13)
 Andreas Jakobsson – Brøndby IF – 2003–05 (37/5)
 Andreas Johansson – AaB, Odense BK – 2007–10 (93/21), 2010-13 (69/10)
 Mattias Jonson – Brøndby IF – 1999-05 (131/40)
 Jon Jönsson – Brøndby IF – 2008–10 (24/2)
 Rasmus Jönsson – AaB, Odense BK – 2013–2016 (63/18), 2016–
 Christian Karlsson – Esbjerg fB, AB – 2001–02 (29/4), 2002–04 (40/1)
 Imad Khalili – Randers FC – 2006–07 (2/0)
 Benjamin Kibebe – FC Nordsjælland – 2008–10 (56/1)
 Magnus Kihlstedt – FCK – 2001–05 (69/0)
 Andreas Klarström – Esbjerg fB – 2005–10 (127/1)
 Valentino Lai – Vejle BK – 2008–09 (27/2)
 Marcus Lantz – Brøndby IF – 2005–08 (57/2)
 Peter Larsson – FCK – 2008–12 (24/0)
 Dick Last – Vejle BK – 1999–2000 (6/0)
 Rawez Lawan – AC Horsens, FC Nordsjælland – 2006–09 (83/14), 2009–10 (30/7)
 Tobias Linderoth – FCK – 2004–07 (82/4)
 Mattias Lindström – AaB – 2004–08 (88/9)
 Jesper Ljung – Vejle BK – 1998–2000 (39/3)
 Johnny Lundberg – FC Nordsjælland – 2006–09 (81/4)
 Jozo Matovac – AaB – 1998–2000 (61/3)
 Lasse Nilsson – AaB – 2007–08 (12/2)
 Mikael Nilsson – Brøndby IF – 2009–12 (77/3)
 Krister Nordin – Brøndby IF – 1999–2002 (58/4)
 Robin Olsen – FCK – 2016– (14/0)
 Erik Wahlstedt – Esbjerg fB – 2001–04 (79/1)
 Alexander Östlund – Esbjerg fB – 2008–09 (6/0)
 Jörgen Pettersson – FCK – 2002–04 (32/6)
 Pablo Piñones-Arce – Vejle BK – 2006–07 (10/7), 2008–09 (10/1)
 Marcus Pode – FC Nordsjælland – 2007–09 (15/1)
 Rade Prica – AaB – 2006–08 (48/28)
 Anders Prytz – Lyngby BK – 1997–98 (4/0)
 Marino Rahmberg – Lyngby BK – 1995–96 (6/1)
 Mikael Rosén – Viborg FF – 2003–06 (77/3)
 Björn Runström – Odense BK – 2008–10 (30/7)
 Mikael Rynell – Esbjerg fB – 2008–10 (22/0)
 Klebér Saarenpää – AaB, Vejle BK – 2000–04 (37/1), 2006–07 (10/2)
 Dan Sahlin – AaB – 1998–99 (5/2)
 Max von Schlebrügge – Brøndby IF – 2007–13 (86/7)
 Pontus Segerström – Odense BK – 2004–05 (8/0)
 Pascal Simpson – FCK – 2000–02 (23/3)
 Jonas Stark – BK Frem – 2003–04 (9/0)
 Babis Stefanidis – Brøndby IF – 2004–05 (15/1)
 Magnus Svensson – Brøndby IF – 1999–2002 (57/1)
 Ola Tidman – FC Midtjylland – 2004–06 (19/0)
 Mattias Thylander – Silkeborg IF – 2004–05 (14/1)
 Martin Ulander – AGF – 2003–05 (21/0)
 Johan Vahlqvist – Lyngby BK – 1997–98 (10/1)
 Jean-Paul Vonderburg – AGF – 1992–93 (5/1)
 Erik Wahlstedt – Esbjerg fB – 2001–04 (79/1)
 Oscar Wendt – FCK – 2006–11 (138/6)
 Magnus Wikström – Vejle BK – 1996–97 (5/0)
 Johan Wiland – FCK – 2009–15 (141/0)
 Robert Åhman-Persson – Viborg FF – 2007–08 (27/0)
 Martin Åslund – Viborg FF – 2005–08 (56/4)

Turkey
 Mustafa Gönden – AB – 2004–05 (1/0)
 Emre Mor – FC Nordsjælland – 2015–16 (13/2)
 Ertugrul Teksen - Lyngby Boldklub - 2019-21 (6/0)

Ukraine
 Maksym Koval – Odense BK – 2015–16 (10/0)

North America (CONCACAF)

Canada
 Patrice Bernier – FC Nordsjælland, Lyngby Boldklub – 2008–11 (76/3), 2011-12 (12/2)
 Adrian Cann – Esbjerg fB – 2008–10 (14/0)
 Charles Gbeke – Herfølge BK – 2004–05 (8/0)
 Ali Gerba – AC Horsens – 2006–07 (15/4)
 Atiba Hutchinson – FCK – 2005–10 (139/22)
 Alen Marcina – Herfølge BK – 2004–05 (1/0)
 Issey Nakajima-Farran – Vejle BK, FC Nordsjælland – 2006–07 (29/6), 2007–09 (46/8)
 Andrew Ornoch – Esbjerg fB – 2007–09 (13/1)
 Marco Reda – AaB – 2004–06 (20/0)
 Josh Wagenaar – Lyngby BK – 2007–08 (2/0)

Costa Rica
 Cristian Bolaños – Odense BK, FCK – 2007–09 (24/3), 2010-14 (101/14)
 Mayron George – Hobro IK, Randers FC, Lyngby Boldklub, FC Midtjylland – 2015-16 (23/9), 2016-18 (23/2), 2017-2018 (24/8), 2018-19 (24/4)
 Dennis Marshall – AaB – 2009–10 (1/0)
 Bryan Oviedo – FCK, FC Nordsjælland – 2010–12 (30/2) 2019-22 (22/0), 2011 (14/0)
 Marco Ureña – FC Midtjylland – 2014 (8/2), 2014 (3/1)

Haiti
 Peguero Jean Philippe – Brøndby IF – 2006–07 (3/2)

Jamaica
 Luton Shelton – AaB – 2008–09 (11/1)

United States
 Jonathan Amon – FC Nordsjælland – 2017–? (37/6)
 Conor O'Brien – SonderjyskE – 2011–13 (45/7) – Nordsjælland – 2012–14 (14/1) – OB – 2013–15 (16/0) – Horsens – 2016–17 (1/0)
 Wade Barrett – AGF – 2002–04 (31/0)
 Mike Burns – Viborg FF – 1995–96 (15/0)
 Danny Califf – AaB, FC Midtjylland – 2005–08 (69/1), 2008–10 (31/1)
 Christian Cappis –  Hobro IK  - 2018-2021 (52/1) Brøndby IF – 2021–? (22/3)
 Derk Droze – Lyngby BK – 1997–98 (1/0)
 Benny Feilhaber – AGF – 2008–10 (36/1)
 Geoffrey Gray – Odense BK – 1991–92 (23/0)
 Will John – Randers FC – 2007–08 (1/0)
 Matt Jordan – Odense BK – 2003–04 (2/0)
 Yuri Morales – Viborg FF – 2004–05 (3/1)
 Lee Nguyen – Randers FC – 2007–09 (9/0)
 Will Orben – FCK, Viborg FF – 1999–2000 (3/0), 2000–01 (3/0)
 Michael Parkhurst – FC Nordsjælland – 2008–13 (107/3)
 Heath Pearce – FC Nordsjælland – 2004–07 (75/2)
 Chris Rolfe – AaB – 2009–10 (7/1)
 Robbie Russell – Viborg FF – 2006–08 (29/0)
 Emmanuel Sabbi – Hobro IK – 2017–? (61/13)
 Gregory Schwager – Vejle BK – 1997–98 (9/1)
 Marcus Tracy – AaB – 2008–10 (15/2)
 Jeremiah White – AGF – 2007–10 (71/6)
 Peter Woodring – AaB – 1993–95 (22/2)
 Joe Zewe – Viborg FF – 2006–07 (4/0)
 Clarence Goodson - Brøndby IF - 2010-2013 (60/6)

Oceania (OFC)

New Zealand
 Winston Reid – FC Midtjylland – 2005–10 (84/2)

South America (CONMEBOL)

Argentina
 Franco Mussis – FCK – 2014–15 (1/0)
 Mauricio Ortiz – AGF – 2003–04 (2/1)
 Alexander Szymanowski – Brøndby IF – 2013–14 (11/4), 2014–15 (36/1)

Brazil
 Ailton – FCK – 2006–10 (93/21)
 Alvaro – FCK – 2003–07 (84/38)
 Thiago Junio de Aquino – AaB – 2003–04 (1/0)
 Baré – Vejle BK – 2001–02 (10/3)
 Bechara – Odense BK, Vejle BK – 2006–08 (37/8), 2008–09 (2/0)
 Marcelo de Souza Braga – Esbjerg fB – 1999–2000 (7/0)
 Bruno Batata - Brøndby IF - 2010-11 (4/1)
 Caca – AaB, Odense BK – 2005–09 (63/14), 2009–11 (35/3)
 Luiz Carlos – Viborg FF – 2007–08 (5/2)
 Chrys – AaB – 2006–08 (11/1)
 Eduardo Delani – Vejle BK – 2008–09 (29/4)
 Fabinho – Randers FC, HB Køge – 2006–08 (38/7), 2009–10 (24/3)
 Junior – Odense BK, FCK, FC Nordsjælland, Randers FC – 2005–06 (16/9), 2007–09 (17/6), 2008–09 (11/5), 2009–10 (10/1)
 Leandro – SønderjyskE – 2005–06 (4/1)
 Gilberto Macena – AC Horsens – 2006–09 (92/33)
 Tulio de Melo – AaB – 2004–05 (19/6)
 José Mota – Randers FC, Viborg FF, AaB – 2004–05 (13/6), 2004–07 (48/34), 2006–08 (12/0)
 Ramón – FC Nordsjælland – 2015 (0/0)
 Régis – Viborg FF – 2006–07 (10/0)
 César Santin – FCK – 2008–14 (161/64)
 Alex José dos Santos – BK Frem – 2003–04 (2/0)
 Saraiva – HB Køge – 2009–10 (9/0)
 Alex da Silva – Randers FC, Viborg FF – 2006–08 (28/3), 2007–08 (7/0)
 Marcelo Oliveira da Silva – AaB – 2004–05 (3/0)
 Ricardo Silva – AGF – 2000–01 (1/0)
 Vragel da Silva – Brøndby IF – 1998–2000 (36/6)
 Rodolfo Soares – Vejle BK – 2006–07 (6/0)
 Jairo Antonio de Souza – BK Frem – 2003–04 (16/1)
 Thiago – Esbjerg fB – 2006–09 (16/1)
 Wellington – AaB – 2004–05 (3/0)
 Claudemir - FCK - 2010-15 (131/10)

Colombia
 John Jairo Mosquera – SønderjyskE – 2005–06 (7/1), 2008–09 (18/3)

Paraguay
 Federico Santander – FCK – 2015 (3/0)

Peru
 Edison Flores – AaB''' 2016– (9/1)

Footnotes

Sources
DanskFodbold.com by Danish Football Association
SuperStats.dk foreign players statistics

Danish Superliga
 
 
Association football player non-biographical articles